Taffy is an animated television series co-created by Mike de Seve and Pierre Sissman. The series is produced by Cyber Group Studios, in co-production with Turner Broadcasting System Europe with the participation of France Televisions for the first season and WarnerMedia, Gulli and Canal J for the second season. The series airs on Boomerang all across Europe. The series is being renewed for a second season. On March 30, 2022, Cyber Group Studios and Gulli renewed the series for a third season.

Plot 
The series follows a grey raccoon, Scraggs, who gets adopted by Mrs. Muchmore after thinking he is a cat named Taffy. Her main pet, a dobermann named Bentley, is determined to reveal Taffy's secret to Mrs. Muchmore. Other characters include Forsythe and friends – Addie, Mish and Mash. Several other secondary and background characters appear often in the show, like Mrs. Muchmore's friends, Mrs. Highcost and Mrs. Allperfect, who are also rich ladies.

Production
In July 2017, France Televisions partnered up with Boomerang to begin producing a Tom and Jerry-inspired slapstick cartoon, which would premiere in Fall 2018 with a total of 78 episodes. The show uses digital puppet animation, with stylized designs reminiscient of cartoons in the 90's and 50's. In September 2019, a second season was renewed, containing 78 7-minute segments, which was set to premiere in 2020 but was delayed to 2022 in multiple Boomerang channels.

Cast

French 
 Emmanuel Garijo as Scraggs, a.k.a. "Taffy"
 Xavier Fagnon as Bentley
 Fily Keita as Mrs. Muchmore ("Madam Millesous")

Additional voices:
 Marc Pérez
 Marie Zidi
 Magalie Rosenzweig

English
 Billy Bob Thompson as Scraggs, a.k.a. "Taffy"
 Tyler Bunch as Bentley
 Serra Hirsch as Mrs. Muchmore
 Jeffrey Hylton as Forsythe
 Starr Busby as Binikos
 Maggie Politi as Mrs. Highcost
 Maria Bamford as Addie
 Lisa Ortiz as Mish
 Vega de Seve as Mash
 Natalie Hitzel as Mrs. Allperfect
 Barrett Leddy as Bradley

Additional voices:
 Dan Green as Ghost Bentley
 Marc Thompson as Ghost Taffy

Episodes

Series overview

Season 1 (2019)

Season 2 (2022) 
These episodes were first shown in Boomerang Southeast Asia.

Broadcast 
The series premiered on Boomerang Africa on 17 December 2018, and later aired on multiple Boomerang stations around the world in 2019, particularly in the UK, which started airing the show on January 7, 2019 and in the Middle East, where it aired in May 2019 on Boomerang MENA. It also came in India on January 24, 2022 on Cartoon Network and in Pakistan on February 19, 2022 on the latter. The second series airs on CBBC in the United Kingdom.

See also
 The Tom and Jerry Show - Another Flash-animated slapstick cartoon that also aired on Boomerang, albeit by Renegade Animation

References

External links
 

Boomerang (TV network) original programming
2010s French animated television series
2018 French television series debuts
French flash animated television series
French children's animated comedy television series
French children's animated fantasy television series
English-language television shows
Television series about raccoons
Animated television series about dogs
Television series by Warner Bros. Television Studios